The neck is the body part between the head and torso of many animals.

Neck may also refer to:

Other uses in anatomy

Bones
 Femur neck, part of the femur bone
 Surgical neck of the humerus
 Anatomical neck of humerus
 Neck of the malleus, part of the ear
 Neck of a rib
 Neck of the scapula
 Neck of the talus

Organs
 Neck of the gallbladder
 Neck of the pancreas
 Neck of the urinary bladder

Arts and entertainment
 Neck (band), a British Celtic punk band
 Neck (film), a 2010 Japanese film
 Neck (music), part of certain string instruments and woodwind instruments
 "Neck" (short story), by Roald Dahl
 Necks (EP), by Thunderbirds Are Now!, 2005
 The Necks, an Australian jazz trio

Places
 Neck, Netherlands
 Neck City, Missouri, United States

Other uses
 Necking (engineering), tensile deformation forming a neck
 Neck (Chinese constellation), in Chinese astronomy
 Neck (water spirit), in Germanic mythology and folklore 
 Volcanic neck or plug, a volcanic landform

See also

 The Neck (disambiguation)
 Hermann Necke (1850–1912)
 Necking (disambiguation)
 Neck of the Woods (disambiguation)
 Cervix (Latin, 'neck') 
 Isthmus (Ancient Greek, 'neck')
 Collum (disambiguation)